Cristián Monckeberg Bruner (born 12 May 1968) is a Chilean lawyer and politician. He was deputy for the 2006–2018 period, president of Renovación Nacional (2014–2018), three–time minister during the second government of the President Sebastián Piñera (2018–2022) and Constituent Conventional of the Republic of Chile.

On 28 July 2020, after Piñera's fifth change of cabinet, he was appointed as Minister Secretary General of the Presidency, succeeding Claudio Alvarado. Then, Monckeberg resigned on 6 January 2021 to run for a quote as a conventional constituent for 10th district in the elections of April.

References

External Links
 

1968 births
Living people
Chilean people of German descent
Gabriela Mistral University alumni
University of Navarra alumni
21st-century Chilean politicians
National Renewal (Chile) politicians
Members of the Chilean Constitutional Convention